Virginia Frances Sterrett (1900–1931) was an American artist and illustrator.

Early life 
Sterrett was born in Chicago, Illinois in 1900. After her father's death, she and her family moved to Missouri but returned to Chicago in 1915. There, she enrolled in high school and later entered the Art Institute of Chicago with scholarship. One year after entering the institute, Sterrett's mother grew ill and Sterrett dropped out to provide for her family. She gained work at an art advertisement agency.

Career
Sterrett received her first commission at the age of 19 (shortly after she was diagnosed with tuberculosis) from the Penn Publishing Company to illustrate Old French Fairy Tales (1920), a collection of works from the 19th-century French author, Comtesse de Ségur (Sophie Fedorovna Rostopchine).

A year after the publication of Old French Fairy Tales, a new title including commissioned works from Sterrett was presented by the Penn Publishing Company—Tanglewood Tales (1921). From 1923, in failing health, Sterrett was able to work on projects for short periods of time only and as a result, she was able to complete just one further commission prior to her death—her own interpretation of Arabian Nights (1928).

Her best-known work is the suite of illustrations for Arabian Nights (1928). She died of tuberculosis.

The comments of the St Louis Post-Dispatch in the supplement published following Sterrett's death (published July 5, 1931) pay fitting tribute to her life and work:

Works
All three books were published by the Penn Publishing Company. They were large books with large type, simple stories, and designed to be gift books for children.

Old French Fairy Tales by Comtesse de Segur, 1920
Tanglewood Tales by Nathaniel Hawthorne, 1921
''Arabian Nights, 1928

References

External links

 
 
 
 Tanglewood Tales illustrations
 Complete Old French Fairy Tales, Tanglewood Tales, and Arabian Nights illustrations

1900 births
1931 deaths
American women illustrators
American children's book illustrators
20th-century illustrators of fairy tales
20th-century American women artists
20th-century deaths from tuberculosis
Tuberculosis deaths in the United States